These are the official results of the women's 400 metres event at the 1992 Summer Olympics in Barcelona, Spain. There were a total number of 41 participating athletes, with six qualifying heats.  The finals were held on July 25.

Records
These were the standing world and Olympic records (in seconds) prior to the 1992 Summer Olympics.

Final

Semifinals

Quarterfinals

Heats

See also
 1987 Women's World Championships 400 metres (Rome)
 1988 Women's Olympic 400 metres (Seoul)
 1990 Women's European Championships 400 metres (Split)
 1991 Women's World Championships 400 metres (Tokyo)
 1993 Women's World Championships 400 metres (Stuttgart)
 1994 Women's European Championships 400 metres (Helsinki)

References

External links
 Official Report
 Results

 
400 metres at the Olympics
1992 in women's athletics
Women's events at the 1992 Summer Olympics